Martin Calvin Hobart (August 1, 1835March 20, 1919) was an American farmer and Republican politician. During the American Civil War he served as an officer in the Iron Brigade of the Army of the Potomac.  He served one term in the Wisconsin State Assembly, representing Columbia County.

Biography
Hobart was born on August 1, 1835, in Niagara County, New York. He moved to Fountain Prairie, Wisconsin, in 1852 and made a living as a farmer. He married Sarah Dyer in 1866.

Military career
During the American Civil War, Hobart enlisted with the 7th Wisconsin Infantry Regiment of the Union Army and was enrolled as a sergeant in Company B of that regiment.  His regiment was sent to the eastern theater of the war.  He was promoted to 1st lieutenant in July 1862, just before the start of the Northern Virginia campaign.  He was wounded in the intense fighting at Gainesville, Virginia, during the first day of the Second Battle of Bull Run.  His company captain was killed at Gainesville, and, despite his wound, Hobart was promoted to replace him.

After recuperating, he participated in the Battle of Chancellorsville, the Second Battle of Rappahannock Station, the Battle of Mine Run, and the Battle of Gettysburg, before being taken prisoner during the Battle of the Wilderness.  While in prison, Hobart was promoted to major and then lieutenant colonel, but was never mustered at that rank.  He was paroled from prison in February 1865, and mustered out with his regiment in July.

Political career
Hobart was a member of the Assembly during the 1885 session. In addition, he was a member of the Columbia County, Wisconsin board. He was a Republican.

Hobart died at the age of 83 in Columbia County, on March 20, 1919.

References

External links

1835 births
1919 deaths
People from Niagara County, New York
People from Fountain Prairie, Wisconsin
Republican Party members of the Wisconsin State Assembly
People of Wisconsin in the American Civil War
Union Army officers
American Civil War prisoners of war
Farmers from Wisconsin